Thermoanaerobacter pseudethanolicus (formerly Clostridium thermohydrosulfuricum and later Thermoanaerobacter ethanolicus) is a thermophilic, strictly anaerobic, spore-forming bacteria that was first found at Yellowstone National Park in the United States. Because of its ability to efficiently ferment sugars, it is thought to be of potential use in producing industrial alcohol.

References

External links 

Type strain of Thermoanaerobacter pseudethanolicus at BacDive -  the Bacterial Diversity Metadatabase

Thermoanaerobacterales
Thermophiles
Anaerobes
Bacteria described in 2007